The Muncie Flyers were a minor league professional ice hockey team in the International Hockey League during the 1948–49 season. The Flyers were based in Muncie, Indiana, and led by player/coach Henry Coupe.

Results

External links
Muncie Flyers statistics

International Hockey League (1945–2001) teams
Sports in Muncie, Indiana
Ice hockey teams in Indiana
Defunct ice hockey teams in the United States
Ice hockey clubs established in 1948
Ice hockey clubs disestablished in 1949
1948 establishments in Indiana
1949 disestablishments in Indiana